"Shades" (Polish:  "Cienie") is one of Bolesław Prus' shortest micro-stories.  Written in 1885, it comes from a several years' period of pessimism in the author's life caused partly by the 1883 failure of Nowiny (News), a Warsaw daily that he had been editing less than a year.  Prus, the "lamplighter" who had striven to dispel darkness and its attendant "fear, errancy, and crime," had failed to sufficiently interest the public in his "observatory of societal facts," Nowiny.

"Shades" is one of several micro-stories by Bolesław Prus that were inspired partly by 19th-century French prose poetry.

Prus scholar Zygmunt Szweykowski writes:

Prus's micro-story "Shades" comprises two parts.  The first half evokes the above-described atmosphere of dread, via Prus's description of an eternal contest between light and darkness.  The second half of the micro-story pictures the efforts of one of a number of nameless lamplighters to dispel the darkness, for as long as his limited lifespan permits.

See also
 "Mold of the Earth" (a micro-story by Bolesław Prus).
 "The Living Telegraph" (a micro-story by Bolesław Prus).
 Prose poetry.
 "A Legend of Old Egypt" (Prus' first historical short story).
 Darkness.

Notes

References

 Christopher Kasparek, "Two Micro-Stories by Bolesław Prus," The Polish Review, 1995, no. 1, pp. 99–103.
 Zygmunt Szweykowski, Twórczość Bolesława Prusa (The Art of Bolesław Prus), 2nd ed., Warsaw, Państwowy Instytut Wydawniczy, 1972.
 Barbara Bobrowska, "Latarnicy Wóycickiego i Prusa, czyli o 'fizjologii parabolicznej'" ("Wóycicki's and Prus' Lamplighters:  'parabolic physiology'"), in  Małe narracje Prusa (Prus's Small Narratives), Gdańsk, słowo/obraz terytoria, 2004, pp. 113–34.

Short stories by Bolesław Prus
Polish short stories
1885 short stories
Existentialist short stories